Nakhjir Kolayeh (also Romanized as Nakhjīr Kolāyeh; also known as Naqsh Kalāyeh) is a village in Layalestan Rural District, in the Central District of Lahijan County, Gilan Province, Iran. At the 2006 census, its population was 1,069, in 305 families.

References 

Populated places in Lahijan County